Robert Cimera (born 17 September 1887, date of death unknown) was an Austrian international footballer.

Cimera played in the 1912 Summer Olympics, scoring once in the match against Germany. He returned to DSC Prag as the club manager beginning in January 1924 until July 1926.

References

1887 births
Year of death missing
Association football defenders
Austrian footballers
Austria international footballers
Olympic footballers of Austria
Footballers at the 1912 Summer Olympics
SK Rapid Wien players
Place of birth missing
DFC Prag players
Footballers from Vienna
Bohemians 1905 managers